Naach ("Dance") is a 2004 Indian Hindi-language dance film directed by Ram Gopal Varma, starring Abhishek Bachchan, Antara Mali and Riteish Deshmukh.

Synopsis 

Abhinav (Abhishek Bachchan) and Reva (Antara Mali) are two, middle-class citizens in the big city of Mumbai. Both are trying to get a breakthrough in their individual profession. Abhinav wants to be an actor and Reva wants to be a choreographer. Both meet, fall in love and spend some intimate moments together.

Abhinav tries to help Reva out, things get better when he gets his first film offer. However, Reva refuses his help and wants to make it on her own. Abhinav has become a huge star. She eventually gets her first offer to choreograph but the director had only wanted to approach Abhinav through her. Eventually, both of them drift apart and break up.

Reva finally gets a genuine offer to choreography by Diwakar (Riteish Deshmukh), who really likes her style and work. Reva by now has become a huge star, and soon she is given the offer to work with Abhinav.

The rest of the film focuses on whether Abhinav and Reva can put their differences aside and if they get back together.

Cast 

 Abhishek Bachchan as Abhinav Kalantri
 Antara Mali as Reva
 Ritesh Deshmukh as Diwakar Pandit
 Rajesh Tandon as Sandesh
 Priya Badlani as Priya
 Manoj Pahwa as Director
 Rajesh Khera as Rajesh Malhotra

Soundtrack

The soundtrack of Naach consists of 8 songs composed by Amar Mohile, Shailendra-Swapnil, and Nitin Raikwar; the lyrics of which were written by Nitin Raikwar, Taabish Romani, Jaideep Sahni, and Makrand Deshpande.

Critical reception

Rujuta Paradkar of Rediff found the story and music of the film to be weak and the structure of the film to be inspired by Rangeela. The critic gave the film a rating of 3.5 out of 5. Taran Adarsh of Bollywood Hungama praised the acting performances of Antara Mali and Abhishek Bachchan and gave the film a rating of 1.5 out of 5 saying that, "NAACH lacks in that vital department that’s the lifeline of every film – script." Aniket Joshi of Planet Bollywood was impressed with the acting performances of the lead actors specially Antara Mali about whom he said that, "Antara Mali probably gives the performance of her career". The critic gave the film a rating of 8 out of 10 saying that, "Though Naach is not outstanding, it is still one of the better films to come out this year. Naach is a must see for all the Bollywood fans who want to see a "real" love story."

References

External links 

2000s Hindi-language films
2004 films
Films directed by Ram Gopal Varma
Indian dance films
T-Series (company) films
Films shot in Oman